Walter Ned "Skip" Hollandsworth is an American writer, journalist, screenwriter, and executive editor for Texas Monthly magazine. In 2010, he won the National Magazine Award for Feature Writing from the American Society of Magazine Editors, for "Still Life", the story of John McClamrock. His true crime history, The Midnight Assassin, about a series of murders attributed to the Servant Girl Annihilator that took place in Austin, Texas, in 1885, was published in April 2016 by Henry Holt and Company.

Hollandsworth co-wrote the Richard Linklater movie Bernie (2011), a low-budget, black comedy film based on his own 1998 article in Texas Monthly, titled "Midnight in the Garden of East Texas". Starring Jack Black, Matthew McConaughey and Shirley MacLaine, the film depicts the 1996 murder of an 82-year-old woman, Marjorie Nugent, in Carthage, Texas, by her 39-year-old companion, Bernhardt "Bernie" Tiede.

Early life
Hollandsworth was born in Kannapolis, North Carolina. He is the son of the late Reverend Walter Ned Hollandsworth, a Presbyterian minister, and Peggy Hollandsworth. His siblings are older sister Cathy, a doctor, and younger sister Laura, a minister.

Hollandsworth grew up in Lexington, Kentucky, where his father was the pastor at Meadowthorpe Presbyterian Church from December 1961, to December 1968. When he was eleven years old, Hollandsworth moved with his family to Texas, settling in Wichita Falls in December 1968, where his father served as pastor of Fain Memorial Presbyterian Church.

Hollandsworth's father, uncles and grandfather graduated from the Union Presbyterian Seminary in Richmond, Virginia. His family assumed that he, too, would become a Presbyterian minister, but Hollandsworth, a self-described "scamp," wrote in Texas Monthly back in 1985, that, "As minister's children, we could not help but be fascinated yet repelled by church ways."

From an early age, Hollandsworth became equally fascinated with North Texas State Hospital, an in-patient mental health facility owned by the state of Texas, located in Wichita Falls, which he described as "a small, starkly normal city of about 100,000 people." In the June 2010 issue of Texas Monthly, Hollandsworth wrote about riding past the state hospital in the back of a pickup truck with his friends on Friday nights, looking for patients. "For us, the state hospital, which nearly everyone referred to as LSU, or Lakeside University, because it was located across from Lake Wichita, was our real-life haunted house. The fact that two thousand adults were being treated for 'insanity' out in those buildings, just past the city limits sign, simply tortured our imaginations." As he became a teenager, he kept returning to the hospital, volunteering in different departments, even playing his cello for some of the patients, drawn "for reasons I couldn't then explain" to what he described as this "community of odd souls who had never been able to make it on the outside." Hollandsworth wrote in Texas Monthly that he eventually realized it was those trips to the state hospital that ultimately led him into journalism:

Years later, while I was giving a speech to a college class, I was asked why I went into journalism. I suddenly blurted out, "I think it all started when I went out to the state hospital." Although this had never occurred to me before, it instantly seemed right. I realized that what I loved about my visits was that I got the chance to study people who went right up to the line of normal behavior—and then, inexplicably, stepped over it. I was captivated by the patients and tried to fathom what it felt like to be swept away by madness.Education
Hollandsworth graduated from Texas Christian University in 1979, with a Bachelor of Arts degree in English.

Career
Hollandsworth began his career as the sports reporter for the Texas Christian University school newspaper, The Daily Skiff, covering the football team. In a September 2011 interview, Hollandsworth commented that he "found the cheerleaders far more interesting than the games themselves ..." During one game, Hollandsworth said, "a cheerleader ran onto the field during a timeout to do a cheer, and I watched, barely able to breathe, as the last of the late afternoon sun caught her blonde hair and smiling face, illuminating her like perfectly placed museum lights illuminate a painting."

After graduating from Texas Christian University, Hollandsworth worked as a reporter and columnist for newspapers in Dallas. In 1981 he worked as a sports reporter for the Dallas Times Herald. He joined Texas Monthly magazine in 1989. He also has worked as a television producer and documentary filmmaker.

Journalist

True crime
Hollandsworth's true crime writing has been recognized by Byliner, Longform and Best American Crime Writing.

Hollandsworth was interviewed for the podcast Criminal in their episode "Cowboy Bob" about the bank robber Peggy Jo Tallas.

Celebrity profiles
Hollandsworth has written numerous celebrity profiles for Texas Monthly, Glamour, Women's Health and others. His subjects have included Farrah Fawcett, Kate Winslet, Brooklyn Decker, Cher, Sandra Bullock, Kelly Clarkson, Tommy Lee Jones, Troy Aikman, and actor Lou Diamond Phillips.

Ghostwriter

A 2010 press release by North Lake College stated that Hollandsworth "regularly works as a ghost writer, producing books and articles for celebrities and other newsmakers. Jan Miller, who, in 1998, represented some of Hollandsworth's ghostwriting projects, told the Dallas Business Journal that she "retains ghostwriters like Skip Hollandsworth of Texas Monthly to assist nervous first-timers."

According to Suzanne Bruring, who worked for Hollandsworth as a transcriptionist from 1998 to 2003, Hollandsworth provided "verbiage as (ghost) author for a Dr. Phil book".

Screenwriter
After reading Hollandsworth's Texas Monthly article in January 1998, director Richard Linklater contacted Hollandsworth with an interest in adapting the article as a film and also to hire Hollandsworth to co-write the screenplay. Bernie made its world premiere on June 16, 2011, at the 2011 Los Angeles Film Festival. The low-budget, independent film opened at theaters in April 2012, and has since earned a score of 92% on the user review aggregator and a 7.6 out of 10 on the average rating by critics compiler at Rotten Tomatoes. Bernie grossed a modest $9,156,000.

Regarding the writing of Bernie, Hollandsworth told Culture Map Houston: "When I realized I was going to get my name on this movie – when I realized, "Hey, I'm a screenwriter!" – I began writing these scenes that I thought were fantastic. My creative side was coming out. But whenever I did that, Rick would ask – in that gentle, loving way of his – "Did that really happen?" And when I said it didn't, he'd say, "Hell, no."

Screen adaptations
Hollandsworth's articles in Texas Monthly have launched three made-for-television movies, and two proposed films: The CBS telepics The Almost Perfect Bank Robbery and Suburban Madness; the 1997 NBC telepic Love's Deadly Triangle: The Texas Cadet Murder (for distribution outside the United States, the DVD was titled Swearing Allegiance); The Goree Girls, a proposed movie set in the 1940s about several women in a Texas prison who form a country-western band, and Still Life, a proposed film based on the Texas Monthly non-fiction article of the same name written by Hollandsworth in 2009, about John McClamrock and his mother Ann.

The Midnight AssassinThe Midnight Assassin,  which was named a New York Times bestseller in May 2016, is a history of Austin, Texas in the year 1885 when a brutal but brilliant serial killer went on a rampage, ritualistically slaughtering seven women over the course of twelve months, and setting off a citywide panic. Three years later, when a man nicknamed Jack the Ripper carried out a similar series of killings in the Whitechapel district of London, England, Scotland Yard detectives speculated that he was the Austin killer who had traveled overseas to continue to carry out his "diabolical work." The New York Times described The Midnight Assassin as "true crime of high quality," "smart and restrained" and "chilling." In its review, the Wall Street Journal called the book a "thoroughly researched, excitingly written history" and an "absorbing work."

Awards
Hollandsworth has received the following journalism awards:

The 2010 National Magazine Award for Feature Writing 
The Texas Institute of Letters O. Henry award for magazine writing
The Charles Green Award for outstanding magazine writing in Texas

Hollandsworth has been a finalist four times for the National Magazine Awards. His work has been included in such publications as Best American Crime Writing and Best American Magazine Writing.''

References

External links
Website for Skip Hollandsworth's book The Midnight Assassin

1957 births
American crime reporters
American male journalists
American magazine editors
American magazine writers
American non-fiction crime writers
American Presbyterians
American male screenwriters
Living people
Texas Christian University alumni
Screenwriters from Texas
Screenwriters from North Carolina